The Rise and Fall of the Trigan Empire, later shortened to The Trigan Empire, was a science fiction comic series written mainly by Mike Butterworth with artwork (initially watercolours, later gouache) by Don Lawrence, among others. It told the story of an alien culture in which futuristic technology, such as antigravity vehicles and energy ray weapons, was blended with architecture, dress, and customs reminiscent of ancient civilizations, the most obvious being those of Ancient Greece and Rome. The stories revolved around a strong and heroic leader who defended his empire from constant threats from both outside and within. The comic featured unique artwork by Don Lawrence in a painterly photo-realistic style.

Background 
The series initially ran from 1965 to 1982, dealing with the long-past events of an empire on the distant planet of Elekton. Heavily influenced by mythological tales, a number of the societies seemed to be based on ancient cultures that had existed in history. Chief among these was the Trigan Empire, apparently modelled on Ancient Greece and the Roman Empire. This similarity even extended to Trigan City, the capital being built on five hills, in a similar fashion to the seven hills of Rome. The Trigans' clothing was similar to that of the Romans, with many of the populace dressed in toga-like garments, or in the case of the soldiery, in Greek or Roman-style armour. A similar likeness could be drawn with Hericon, the chief rival in power to the Trigans, whose appearance seemed to mirror that of elements of the Byzantine Empire, and the Persian Empire.

According to Butterworth: "The original Impetus was from that veritable genius Leonard Matthews, then my senior group editor when I was editing Sun and Comet. He threw the first introductory script at me and told me to take it from there. He had no idea where to further it but he knew where to look for a guy who did."

The first strip told of a spaceship crashing into a swamp on Earth, the crew frozen to death, with many written volumes inside in an unknown language. Studies of the crew reveal them to be humanoid, but around 12 feet tall (3.6 m). After many years, the spaceship is turned into the central attraction of an amusement park. Eventually, at a very advanced age, a scientist—Peter Richard Haddon—who has studied the books from the spaceship as a young man manages to translate the volumes, and begins to relate the tales.

The Trigans began as a nomadic tribe called the Vorgs, with no technology, initially under the leadership of three brothers, Trigo, Brag and Klud. Trigo persuades his more conservative brothers that in the face of changing events, namely the ambitions of the Lokan Empire, they must settle. The fledgling Trigan nation is established via a merger of the nomadic Vorgs and the technically advanced people of Tharv (who arrived as refugees to the Plains of Vorg after they were defeated by the Lokans) under the leadership of Trigo, with the trappings of a Romanesque civilization with swords, lances and Roman-style clothing, but with high-tech ray guns, aircraft and a high-tech navy. In a later story, the Trigans create a rocketship in months to fly to one of Elekton's moons. Several of the other civilizations show a similar blend of low and high tech.

Publication history 
The strip debuted in the first issue of the British magazine Ranger in September 1965 and then in the  British Look and Learn magazine from issue #232 (June 1966) when the two titles merged after the 40th issue of Ranger. Both titles were weekly educational magazines designed for children; although mainly filled with educational features on life, history, science and technology, both contained a small comic strip section in each issue. Unusually for a British comic, the strip was printed in colour.

The series ran in Look and Learn until the title ceased publication with issue #1049, in April 1982, comprising a run of 854 issues in total, divided between the two magazines.

In addition to the weekly strips, a very small number of Trigan Empire stories were published in Ranger annuals and a Vulcan summer special.

In 1975-1976, the series thus far was reprinted in its original sequential order, in Vulcan, a weekly glossy-format comic, which reprinted the strips in full colour, albeit edited and resized, alongside colour reprints of other British comics serials of the 1960s.

There were a number of reprints in hardback format. In 1978, Hamlyn Publishing in the United Kingdom printed a hardback collection of early Trigan Empire stories titled simply The Trigan Empire; this was reprinted in the United States by Chartwell Publishing. Other than Lawrence's signature being visible on the title-page art, neither he nor Butterworth are credited in this edition. A later collection, also in hardback, was printed by Hawk Publishing in 1989 as Tales from the Trigan Empire. Both the Hamlyn and the Hawk books presented edited versions of the stories; most notably, in the Hawk book there are sometimes entire pages that have been left out. Several stories were repeated in both collections, but The Trigan Empire collection has the earliest, showing the establishment of the Empire.

In 2004-2008, the stories drawn by Don Lawrence were reprinted by the Don Lawrence Collection in luxury hardback limited editions. These editions contain the complete stories, without any of the omissions that were a feature of the earlier reprints, particularly the Hawk Publishing book. They were not reprinted from Look and Learn; in many cases they were printed from the original artwork, and used revised fonts to make the text easier to read.

The rights to The Trigan Empire were bought by Rebellion Developments in 2018. Initial plans were to publish the sequence drawn by Lawrence in four volumes; a first volume appeared in March 2020, a second in December 2020, and a third in July 2021. The second and third volumes included stories from the 1960s and early 1970s not illustrated by Lawrence, raising the question whether serials drawn by other artists during the later years of the strip would be included in subsequent volumes. The fourth volume, released in 2022, similarly included serials from the mid-1970s drawn by artists other than Lawrence.  A fifth volume, to be published in 2023, will continue to proceed in order of original publication irrespective of artist, completing Lawrence's own sequence while also including stories illustrated by Oliver Frey.

Main characters 
 Trigo Trigo is the founder of the Empire. With his two brothers Brag and Klud, he was the leader of a tribe of Vorgs. At this time the Lokan Empire was instituting a military buildup with an intent to take over the entire planet. Trigo had a vision of a nation where the Vorg tribesmen could give up their nomadic existence and band together in civilization. He knew that the Lokans were intent on conquest and felt that if the Vorgs were not united they would become extinct. When his initial plans to build a city on the plains of Vorg fail, there is a fateful meeting with refugees from the nation of Tharv which has been attacked by Loka. Among these refugees is the architect Peric who agrees to help Trigo with his plans as long as his people are allowed to stay there. Although Brag was willing to give up his claims of leadership to his people to allow Trigo to become sole ruler, his brother Klud had no such plan and tried to assassinate Trigo. In the years to come, Trigo will institute a treaty with Hericon, the other great power on the planet of Elekton, be crowned first Emperor of the Trigan Empire, and face many other threats to himself and his empire.
 Brag Trigo's brother. While some consider him slow and perhaps a bit stupid, Brag is well-meaning and ever faithful to his brother. Despite living in relative luxury with all the benefits of more advanced technology there are times that Brag wishes he was back to his life as a simple Vorg huntsman. He keeps himself in good physical shape despite growing older. If Brag can be classed as having a fault, it is that he can be manipulated by those cleverer than himself.
 Janno Janno is the son of Brag and nephew to Emperor Trigo. A courageous individual, he has a natural aptitude as an atmosphere craft pilot. He is friends with Keren, the son of Chief Imbala of Daveli, and Roffa from the City State of Ellul. Janno is regularly a representative of Trigan City, whether it is as an athlete in the olympic style games, or as a diplomatic envoy. In some stories it is mentioned in a short dialogue that Trigo had a thought to name him his successor.
 Peric Chief architect of the destroyed nation of Tharv, Peric with his daughter and other Tharvish refugees made their way into the desert of Vorg after the destruction of the main city of Tharv by Lokan forces. Peric is of advanced years but remains fairly healthy. He is regarded as the greatest living architect on Elekton and an accomplished engineer and scientist. He is often behind many of the great accomplishments of the Empire.
 Salvia Salvia is the daughter of Peric and is the most visible female character in the series. Salvia is skilled in Tharvish medicine, a trait that would serve the Empire well on a number of occasions, whether it is saving Trigo from potent poison inflicted by Trigo's brother, or the life of Keren, son of Chief Imbala of Daveli, or the life of the Chieftainess of the Tamaz desert warriors.
 Keren Janno's best friend and son of Chief Imbala of Daveli whose culture closely mirrors that of Central American Indian civilisations. Keren was introduced in the second tale of the series, "Crash in the Jungle". Keren and his people are shown as being either blue skinned or dark green, depending on the printing.
 Lady Ursa Sister of King Kassar of Hericon and probably the next most visible female character of the series. She and Trigo were married, as guarantee for the ratification of a trade treaty, at the start of the story titled "War With Hericon". They would have triple sons, although two would later be killed.
 King Zorth The autocratic, megalomaniacal, despotic and tyrannical leader of Loka whose obsession with planet conquest (especially that of the Trigan Empire) ends only when he is overthrown by his own people. The Lokans are given an olive complexion and appear somewhat Asiatic.

Creative team 
From its start in 1965 until 1976, the series was mainly created by writer Mike Butterworth and artist Don Lawrence. For stories in two Ranger annuals and some fill-in serials, other artists made a contribution. During a sabbatical, Philip Corke replaced Don Lawrence. From mid-1976 until the end of 1977, Oliver Frey was the artist.  In 1978, Ken Roscoe took over the writing, and concluded the series with artist Gerry Wood.

Writers 

 Mike Butterworth (1965-1977)
 Ken Roscoe (1978-1982)

Artists 

 Don Lawrence (1965-1973, 1975-1976)
 Ernest Ratcliff (1966)
 Ron Embleton (1967, 1969)
 Miguel Quesada (1972, 1974), for long wrongly credited to Ramon Sola
 Philip Corke (1974-1975)
 Oliver Frey (1976-1977)
 Gerry Wood (1977-1982)

Timeline

Tales 
Although there were no official titles for most of the stories, the following table lists the commonly used names in order of first publication.  

Other tale
 "They Came From out of the Night", also known as "The Underworld of Vuldar" (text story illustrated by Don Lawrence, author unknown, Vulcan Summer Special 1976)

Collected editions 

The stories have been collected into volumes a number of times:

 The Look and Learn Book of the Trigan Empire (70 pages, IPC/Fleetway, 1973)
 The Trigan Empire (192 pages, Hamlyn, October 1978)
 Tales from the Trigan Empire (160 pages, Hawk Books, 1989)
 The Trigan Empire (The Don Lawrence Collection, hardcover):
 The Invaders from Gallas (August 2008)
 Revolution in Zabriz (122 pages, March 2007)
 The Reign of Thara (98 pages, November 2006)
 The Three Princes (98 pages, March 2006)
 The Red Death (114 pages, April 2008)
 The Puppet Emperor (114 pages, December 2007)
 The Rallu Invasion (96 pages, August 2006)
 The Prisoner of Zerss (98 pages, March 2004)
 The Curse of King Yutta (98 pages, October 2005)
 The House of the Five Moons (94 pages, March 2005)
 The Sun Worshippers (106 pages, October 2004)
 The Green Smog (November 2008)
 The Rise and Fall of the Trigan Empire (Rebellion)
 Volume I (304 pages, March 2020) comprises stories published from 1965 to 1968
 Volume II (288 pages, December 2020) comprises stories published from 1968 to 1970
 Volume III (256 pages, July 2021) comprises stories published from 1970 to 1973
 Volume IV (240 pages, August 2022) comprises stories published from 1973 to 1975 and one story published in 1967
 Volume V (240 pages, October 2023) comprises stories published from 1975 to 1977

Adaptations 
Two radio plays were produced in Dutch, "The Mysterious Meteorite" and "Lumbwabwa the Usurper".

Movie rights for a feature film based on the strip were optioned in 2009. In December 2011 it was revealed that a script existed and that the film's producers were holding meetings in England to find a director.

Time Inc had a TV series in development in 2017 with 10 episodes written but production halted when Rebellion acquired the rights.

See also 
Storm (Don Lawrence)

Notes

References

External links 
 triganempire.co.uk

British comic strips
1965 comics debuts
1982 comics endings
Science fiction comics
Drama comics
Comics adapted into radio series
Fictional empires